This article lists the winners and nominees for the Black Reel Award for Outstanding Television Documentary or Special. This award is given to the directors and was first awarded during the 2001 ceremony. In May 2017 the category was moved from the film awards as part of the Black Reel Awards for Television honors thus resulting in two separate winners in 2017.

Winners and nominees
Winners are listed first and highlighted in bold.

2000s

2010s

2020s

Total awards by network
 HBO - 7
 AMC - 2
 Showtime - 2
 Black Starz! - 1
 ESPN - 1
 Lifetime - 1
 NBC - 1
 PBS - 1
 Spike TV - 1
 VH1 - 1

References

Black Reel Awards